Iberia Star Tbilisi is a futsal club based in Tbilisi, Georgia, currently playing in the Georgian Futsal League and the UEFA Futsal Cup.

Up to 2014/15 they were the only team to compete in every edition of the UEFA Futsal Cup. At the end of 2014 the futsal team was disbanded.

Honours
Up to 2014 they have won twelve Georgian Futsal League championships and five cup titles.
9 Georgian League: 2004, 2005, 2006, 2007, 2008, 2009, 2010, 2011, 2012
4 Georgian Futsal Cup: 2004, 2005, 2006, 2010

Other teams
A women's football team has won the Georgia women's football championship in 2014.

References

External links
Official Website
UEFA profile

Futsal clubs in Georgia (country)
Futsal clubs established in 2003
2003 establishments in Georgia (country)